Held Up is a 1999 American crime buddy comedy film starring Nia Long and Jamie Foxx.

Plot
While on a road trip in the Southwest, Rae (Long) discovers that her man, Michael (Foxx), spent the $15,000 they set aside for a home on a vintage Studebaker. Rae promptly dumps Michael at a convenience store and hops a ride to the airport. Soon after, Michael loses the car when a young kid cons him out of the keys.

Michael soon finds his day going from bad to worse when he's caught up in a botched robbery at the convenience store where he's now stranded. The cops (local vigilantes) show up ready for a gunfight. Michael finds himself trying to convince the gunman (Yáñez) to let him and the other hostages go, all while trying to plan how to get to the airport before Rae's flight leaves.

Cast and characters
Jamie Foxx as Michael Dawson
Nia Long as Rae Swanson 
Barry Corbin as Pembry 
Eduardo Yáñez as Rodrigo
John Cullum as Jack 
Dalton James as Sunny
Roselyn Sanchez as Trina
Sarah Paulson as Mary
Jake Busey as Deputy Rick Beaumont
Julie Hagerty as Gloria
Natalia Cigliuti as Wilma
Herta Ware as Alice
Andrew Jackson as Billy
Sam Gifaldi as Rusty
Diego Fuentes as Sal
Sam Vlahos as Jose
Billy Morton as Delbert
Harper Roisman as Howard
Gary Owen as Clute
Chris Scott as Gladys
Tim Dixon as Leon
Gerry Quigley as Horace
Michael Shamus Wiles as Biker

Soundtrack

A soundtrack containing hip hop music was released on March 14, 2000 by Spot Music.

References

External links

Held Up at Metacritic

1999 films
1990s buddy comedy films
1990s English-language films
1999 comedy films
American buddy comedy films
African-American films
Films directed by Steve Rash
Films produced by Neal H. Moritz
Original Film films
Trimark Pictures films
Films scored by Robert Folk
Films about robbery
1990s American films
English-language comedy films